Chief's Point 28 is an Aboriginal reserve located between Sauble Beach and Wiarton, Ontario on Lake Huron. It is one of the reserves of the Saugeen First Nation.

Like Saugeen 29 this band owns land rented to cottagers who pay an annual lease fee for the use of the land. The current (mid 2019) lease contract between the cottagers and the two Reserves is in effect until 30 April 2021.

References

External links
 Canada Lands Survey System

Ojibwe reserves in Ontario
Communities in Bruce County
Unceded territories in Ontario
Saugeen First Nation